Punyawee Jungcharoen (IPA: [pun.já.wiː t͡ɕɯŋ.t͡ɕà.rɤːn]; born 20 September 1995), or nickname Aom, is a member of the Thai idol girl group CGM48, an international sister group of the Japanese idol girl group AKB48, where she is the captain of the group and concurrently a member of CGM48's Team C. Previously, she was one of the second generation members of BNK48

Early life 
Aom was born in Chiang Mai Province. She graduated from the Faculty of Science (Insurance Actuarial Science and Risk Management : ACT) of Thammasat University.

Career
On April 29, 2018, Aom passed BNK48's second-generation auditions. Her debut stage performance was on May 11, 2018, at BNK48's Trainee Stage. Thoe Khue Melodi was the single where Aom was selected to sing the title track for the first time.

On June 10, 2019, it was announced Aom would transfer to CGM48 with Rina Izuta and she will be the group's captain. Her last BNK48's stage was on August 28, 2019. She started activities as a CGM48 member in October 2019.

On February 9, 2020, Aom got promoted to an official member belonging to Team C and she was part of CGM48's debut single Chiang Mai 106.

In BNK48 9th Single Senbatsu General Election, Aom placed 25th with 4,942 votes. It was her first ever ranking.

Discography

CGM48 singles

CGM48 Albums

BNK48 singles

Other singles

Series 
  XYZ - Mind (2021)
 Triage - Mai (2022)

Movie 
BNK48: One Take - Herself (2020)
 Hao Peng Jah Yah Gang Nong - Herself (2021)

Television 
Victory BNK48 (2018)

References

External links
 Aom's Profile on CGM48 official website

1995 births
Living people
Punyawee Jungcharoen
Punyawee Jungcharoen
Punyawee Jungcharoen
Punyawee Jungcharoen
Punyawee Jungcharoen